Thaeides is a Neotropical genus of butterfly in the family Lycaenidae.

Species

Thaeides theia  (Hewitson, 1870)  Ecuador, Brazil(Rio de Janeiro)
Thaeides muela  (Dyar, 1913)  Peru
Thaeides goleta  (Hewitson, 1877)  Colombia
Thaeides xavieri  (Le Crom & Johnson, 1997)  Colombia
Thaeides pyrczi  (Johnson, Le Crom & Constantino, 1997)  Venezuela.

References

Eumaeini
Lycaenidae of South America
Lycaenidae genera